Pasquale Marino (born 13 July 1962) is an Italian football manager and former midfielder. He most recently served as the manager of Crotone.

Career

Playing career
In his playing career, started for his home team, Marsala, Marino never played in divisions higher than Serie C1, and ended his career for Catania in 1996–97.

Coaching career
His coaching career begun in 1997–98 for Serie D team Milazzo, where he nearly won the league at his debut, ending in second place. However, his outbreak came at Paternò, which he led on two consecutive promotions from Serie D to Serie C1. He then signed for Serie C2 Foggia, which he led to an immediate Serie C1 promotion. He made his Serie B debut in 2004–05 with Arezzo, replacing Mario Somma. Fired in the half-season and replaced by Marco Tardelli, he was successively recalled at the helm of the team, ending in 14th place.

In 2005, he became coach of Catania: in his first season for the rossoblu, Marino brought the team back to Serie A after over 20 years. He also coached Catania in its 2006–07 Serie A campaign. After a very impressive start that brought Catania up to the highest table positions, Catania experienced a negative streak following the riots in the Sicilian derby which caused the death of a policeman and resulted in the Catania home stadium to be disqualified for the remainder of the season. After Catania saved in the last matchday, thanks to a 2–1 win to relegation rivals Chievo, Marino announced he was going to leave his post. He later signed a four-year contract with Udinese. Speaking to SkyItalia in the post-match interview, Marino didn't hide his disappointment following the lacklustre display by his side against bottom placed Reggina. “We were awful this afternoon, and despite having a numerical advantage, it seemed as if we were the team playing in nine men," snarled Marino. "I am very disappointed with the display, despite the positive result. I certainly was not expecting such a poor display from my men today, as I expect everyone to give their all when they put on the Zebrette shirt.”

He was stripped of his managerial duties on 22 December 2009, as Udinese failed to impress in the first half of the 2009–10 season, and was replaced by Gianni De Biasi. He was appointed back at the helm of Udinese on 21 February 2010, after De Biasi was sacked due to poor results.

In June 2010 he was appointed new head coach of Parma, replacing Francesco Guidolin. On 3 April 2011 Marino, after the home defeat with Bari was sacked. On 22 December 2011, he was appointed the new head coach of Genoa to replace Alberto Malesani who was sacked after a disastrous 1–6 away defeat against Napoli. Marino's tenure as Genoa coach however turned out to be rather disappointing, as he did not manage to bring the team back into the fight for a European competition spot and instead left it close to the relegation zone; he was ultimately dismissed on 2 April 2012 after a 4–5 loss to Inter, and replaced by his predecessor Alberto Malesani.

He then accepted an offer to become new head coach of Serie B promotion hopefuls Pescara for the 2013–14 season, but was dismissed later throughout the season due to poor results.

Marino returned into management on 30 October 2014, taking over from Giovanni Lopez at Vicenza, still in Serie B.

On 6 June 2016, Marino was appointed manager of Frosinone. He left the club by the end of the season, after losing automatic promotion on the final days of the season, and then being surprisingly defeating by Carpi in the playoff semi-finals.

On 12 October 2017, he was named new head coach of Serie B club Brescia. He was dismissed by Brescia on 16 January 2018.

In June 2018 he was appointed by Spezia as new head coach. He guided Spezia to a promotion playoff spot, during which they lost to Cittadella in the first round.

On 7 June 2019, he was named new head coach of Serie B club Palermo, thus marking his comeback as a head coach in his native Sicily. However, he never actually managed to serve on his role as the club was excluded from Serie B on 12 July 2019 due to financial irregularities.

On 26 January 2020, he was appointed as head coach of Serie B club Empoli.

On 11 August 2020, his contract was terminated by mutual consent by Empoli, and the following day he was hired as manager of SPAL. He was fired by SPAL on 16 March 2021, following a 0–3 loss to Pisa.

On 29 October 2021, he was appointed new head coach of Serie B relegation struggling Crotone, replacing Francesco Modesto. He was fired on 10 December 2021, after Crotone gained only 1 points in 7 games under his coaching, and replaced by Modesto.

Managerial statistics

References

1962 births
Living people
People from Marsala
Italian footballers
Serie C players
Serie D players
S.S. Akragas Città dei Templi players
A.C.R. Messina players
Catania S.S.D. players
Potenza S.C. players
Italian football managers
A.S.D. Ragusa Calcio managers
Calcio Foggia 1920 managers
Brescia Calcio managers
S.S. Arezzo managers
Catania S.S.D. managers
Udinese Calcio managers
Parma Calcio 1913 managers
Genoa C.F.C. managers
Empoli F.C. managers
Delfino Pescara 1936 managers
L.R. Vicenza managers
Frosinone Calcio managers
Serie A managers
S.P.A.L. managers
F.C. Crotone managers
Serie B managers
Association football midfielders
Footballers from Sicily
Sportspeople from the Province of Trapani